Laundry Day is an American independent dark comedy crime film directed and written by Randy mack. The film is set in New Orleans and stars Kerry Cahill, Billy Slaughter, Dave Davis, and Samantha Ann. It is the directorial debut of Mack. The original score was composed and performed by Peter Orr of New Orleans band Sneaky Pete & The Fens. It is currently represented by Circus Road Films.

Plot
Based on a real events. A brawl erupts in a 24-hour bar-laundromat-nightclub between four New Orleans hustlers: a self-destructive musician, a corrupt bartender, a homeless street performer, and the city's least competent drug dealer. Each person's day leading up to the fight is revisited in turn, revealing a seedy and tragicomic web of unintended consequences, unforeseen repercussions, and service industry calamity.

Cast
 Dave Davis as Ethan  
 Kerry Cahill as Dee  
 Billy Slaughter as Bart
 Samantha Ann as Natalee
 Theodus Crane as Stovey
 Andy J Forest as Freddy
 Carrie Anne Rose as The Gutterfemme
 Michael Martin as Trente Sous Serge
 Rebecca Hollingsworth as the Texas Dancer
 John Jabaley as Mr Goat
 Peter Orr as D.J. Caterpillar
 Misty Marshall as Officer Douvert
 Mason Joiner as The Kid
 Todd Voltz as Smitty
 Brian Bonhagen as Squirrel

Awards and honors
2016 CineFlix Film Festival (Louisiana)
 Winner - Best Feature - Jury Prize - "The Robert Evans Award"

References

External links
 
 

2016 films
2016 black comedy films
Films shot in New Orleans
American black comedy films
American independent films
Culture of New Orleans
Films set in New Orleans
New Orleans in fiction
2016 comedy films
2016 independent films
2010s English-language films
2010s American films